Farrington Field is an 18,500-capacity multi-use stadium located in Fort Worth, Texas. Designed by Preston M. Geren, the stadium was financed with federal funds from the WPA and a local contribution from the school district. Designed in the PWA/Clssical style of moderne architecture, the stadium was completed in 1939 and was named in memory of E.S. Farrington, a long time superintendent of the Fort Worth Independent School District. In 1986 local preservationists succeeded in preserving the stadium. The stadium is the 2nd largest in Fort Worth proper and is used mainly for football and track & field.

In February 2021, the parking lots of the stadium were used to stage a drive-through COVID-19 vaccination site.

References

External links
 Information at Texas Bob - Football stadiums
 Background at Fort Worth Architecture
 Farrington Field lives on as a visionary's legacy from Fort Worth Star-Telegram

Sports venues completed in 1939
Art Deco architecture in Texas
American football venues in the Dallas–Fort Worth metroplex
High school football venues in Texas
Sports venues in Fort Worth, Texas
1939 establishments in Texas
Fort Worth Independent School District